The Bolivian women's football championship (Spanish: Campeonato Nacional de clubes de Fútbol de femenino) is the national competition for women's football in Bolivia. The winner qualifies for the Copa Libertadores de Fútbol Femenino, the South American Champions League. The competition is organised by the Bolivian Football Federation.

History 
The national championship was established in 2005,  regional championships were existent earlier.

Format 
The national championship is played late each year. Participating are the winners of the regional leagues that year.

List of champions 
Below is the list of all champions:

Note: Gerimex was renamed Santa Cruz FC in 2012.

Titles by club

References

External links 

women
Bolivia
Recurring sporting events established in 2005
Women's football in Bolivia
Women's sports leagues in Bolivia